Alfred Loritz (born 24 April 1902 in Munich – died 14 April 1979 in Vienna) was a German lawyer and politician who briefly rose to prominence in the immediate aftermath of the Second World War.

Early life
A Munich lawyer, the Catholic Loritz was a right-wing opponent of the Nazi regime. In early 1939, he made contact with a group of Bavarian monarchists in an ultimately-abortive attempt to foment discontent. Ultimately he would spend most of the war in exile in Switzerland.

Political career
In 1945, he established his own political party, the Wirtschaftliche Aufbau-Vereinigung (WAV) and soon gained a reputation as a demagogic speaker. A believer in a strong federal Germany, Loritz's fiery rhetoric attracted attention both in Germany itself and from the occupiers, with some even suggesting that he might prove to be "a new Hitler". However, although he belonged to the political right, Loritz's populism lacked a strong ideological basis, and he appealed mainly to internal refugees who saw him as a strong voice for their defence. He was also a strong advocate of denazification and under the Bavarian government of Hans Ehard was chosen to head up a special ministry for that purpose.

Always at best a loose organisation, the WAV won twelve seats in the Bundestag in the 1949 election but by then had already largely disintegrated as an organisation and saw its vote collapse in the state elections of 1950 and the municipal elections of 1952, when its vote share had fallen to 0.3%. In the Bundestag, the party quickly fell apart, with four deputies breaking away in October 1950 to link up with the Centre Party. That was followed by six more in December 1951 leaving WAV to join the German Party, along with a seventh, who joined the Deutsche Rechtspartei. Loritz was thus left as the sole member in the Bundestag and, although a handful of far-right independents linked up with him in 1953, his influence had largely gone.

Disappearance and death
In the late 1950s Loritz sought to relaunch his political career in Bremen, but before this could take off he was arrested on charges of incitement to perjury. Loritz escaped to Austria where he was eventually granted political asylum. He would live out his days there, dying in a Vienna hospital in 1979.

References

External links
 

1902 births
1979 deaths
20th-century German lawyers
Fugitives wanted by Germany
German Roman Catholics
Leaders of political parties in Germany
Members of the Bundestag for Bavaria
Politicians from Munich